Buriram Airport (also known as Buri Ram Airport) , is an airport serving Buriram (also known as Buri Ram) and Surin, the capitals of Buriram and Surin Provinces in Thailand.

Facilities

Future Expansion
In 2019, the Department of Airports announced a 700 million baht second passenger terminal will be built at Buriram airport. It will increase the airport's capacity from 750,000 per year to 1.7 million. There will be an extension on the length of the runway to accommodate larger aircraft in the future.

Airlines and destinations

Previously served airlines

Statistics

Traffic by calendar year

References

External links 

Air Asia
Nok Air
 
 

Airports in Thailand
Airports established in 1996
Buildings and structures in Buriram province